The Skirmish of Pastrengo was fought between the Piedmontese and Austrian army on 30 April 1848, in the course of the First Italian War of Independence.

Prelude
The Austrian forces were deployed in a way that threatened any Piedmontese attack against the fortress of Peschiera del Garda, and against Verona. Therefore, the Piedmontese High Command decided to act energetically against it to neutralize this threat, with the II Corps (commanded by General Ettore Gerbaix De Sonnaz), supported by the reserve division.

Although some sources claimed that the troops of the Kingdom of Sardinia were for the most part volunteers from regions of northern Italy, in fact those consisted of four brigades of the Piedmontese regular army. Among the troops at Pastrengo, there were recorded, 1,000 volunteers from Parma, 150 volunteers from Piacenza and 400 students from Pavia and Turin.

The Skirmish
The Piedmontese attack, while done with superior forces, was executed rather poorly, in frontal actions and without taking adequate advantage of the numerical superiority, nor with proper reconnaissance done before the battle. On the right the brigade "Savoia" proceeded slowly, hampered by the unknown terrain; on the centre and right the brigades "Cuneo" and "Piemonte" met with better success, and after three hours at 14:00 the Piedmontese line began to advance. Despite attempts by the Austrian commander to delay it, the offensive proceeded up to the pontoon bridge on the river Adige. After this success, however, the Piedmontese stopped and did not advance further.

As documented by the New monthly magazine: Vol. 83, 1848: 

"On the 30th of April, what is called in the bulletin issued from the headquarters of the Sardinian army, "the first battle between the two armies of Italy," was fought. The end proposed was to occupy Bussolengo, Pastrengo, and Piovezzana, and to attempt to force the Adige. The affair commenced at half-past eleven, A.m. The Italian troops succeeded in driving the Austrians from all the positions which they occupied at Pastrengo, and in gaining the heights which command the Adige."

Aftermath
While a Piedmontese victory, it was not a complete success, since Field Marshal Radetzky still had full use of the vital road that connected him to Trento and the Empire; had this been cut, the Austrian situation would have become critical.

As documented by the New monthly magazine: Vol. 83, 1848: 

"During the night of the 30th, Bussolengo was taken by the Sardinians, and the passage of the Adige effected at Pontone."

References

Sources
 

Pastrengo
Pastrengo
Pastrengo
1848 in Italy
1848 in the Austrian Empire
April 1848 events